Rendol Whidden Ganong,  (October 2, 1906 – March 18, 2000) was a Canadian businessman from the Province of New Brunswick. Known as Whidden, he was born in the border town of St. Stephen, the eldest son of Berla Frances Whidden and Arthur D. Ganong.

Ganong studied at St. Stephen High School, Rothesay Collegiate School in Rothesay, New Brunswick, and Royal Military College in Kingston, Ontario. In 1927 he went to work for Ganong Bros., the family-owned chocolate making business.

In 1955-56, Whidden Ganong served as Chairman of the Atlantic Provinces Economic Council. In 1957 he succeeded his father as president of the firm, serving in that capacity until his retirement in 1977. He was named a Member of the Order of Canada in 1989.

Whidden and Eleanor Ganong maintained a home in St. Stephen and owned a  farm at Todd's Point, New Brunswick located five miles (8 km) east of St. Stephen along New Brunswick Route 1. The property separates the St. Croix Estuary from Oak Bay. Whidden Ganong died in 2000, predeceased by his wife in 1982. Their farm property is now the Ganong Nature Park.

References

 Folster, David. The Chocolate Ganongs of St. Stephen, New Brunswick (1991) Goose Lane Editions 
 Craigs, Melodie. Ganong, The Candy Family (1984) Literacy Council of Fredericton 
Ganong Nature Park Trails

1906 births
2000 deaths
Businesspeople from New Brunswick
People from St. Stephen, New Brunswick
Canadian chief executives
Members of the Order of Canada
Canadian Baptists
R. Whidden
Royal Military College of Canada alumni
20th-century Baptists